Taner Taşkın (born 27 October 1972) is a retired Turkish football defender and later manager.

References

1972 births
Living people
Turkish footballers
Manisaspor footballers
Gençlerbirliği S.K. footballers
Çorumspor footballers
Turkey under-21 international footballers
Turkish football managers
Manisaspor managers
Sarıyer S.K. managers
Samsunspor managers
Association footballers not categorized by position